José Casabona Perún (born 8 February 1957) is a Spanish sprinter. He competed in the men's 4 × 400 metres relay at the 1980 Summer Olympics.

References

1957 births
Living people
Athletes (track and field) at the 1980 Summer Olympics
Spanish male sprinters
Spanish male hurdlers
Olympic athletes of Spain
Place of birth missing (living people)